Zieper v. Metzinger was a case brought before the United States District Court for the District of New Jersey in which filmmaker Michael Zieper sued several officials of the Department of Justice. It was found that the actions of several Federal Bureau of Investigation agents and a United States Attorney may have violated the First Amendment rights of Zieper and others.  The case was ultimately dismissed by the judge.

At issue in the case was a film, Military Takeover in New York City, a work of fiction concerning the events of the upcoming New Year's Eve 1999. Produced by Michael Zieper of West Caldwell, New Jersey, the film was posted on the Internet at CrowdedTheater.com. The film was similar in its fictional portrayal of supposedly real events to The War of the Worlds and The Blair Witch Project.

A segment about the film was broadcast on New York television station UPN 9 on November 10, 1999; that night, West Caldwell police and FBI agents went to Zieper's home, although he was not arrested. Agent Joe Metzinger of the FBI, one of the defendants named in the case, was involved in the investigation of Military Takeover in New York City.

There were five co-defendants, including Metzinger. The others were: Attorney General Janet Reno; FBI Director Louis Freeh; Mary Jo White, U.S. Attorney for the Southern District of New York; and Lisa Korologos, assistant U.S. Attorney.

The American Civil Liberties Union assisted the plaintiff.

The case was dismissed on grounds of qualified immunity.

External links
New York Law Journal article about the case
ACLU: Complaint in Zieper v. Metzinger

Federal Bureau of Investigation
United States Free Speech Clause case law
United States District Court for the District of New Jersey cases
1999 in United States case law
United States lawsuits
Legal immunity
United States District Court case articles without infoboxes